Gumbo is the surname of the following notable people:
Aleck Gumbo (born 1940), Minister of Economic Development in Zimbabwe
 Joram Gumbo, Zimbabwean politician
Judy Gumbo (born 1943), Canadian-American activist
Nicholas Gumbo, Kenyan politician
Rahman Gumbo, Zimbabwean football player and manager
Rashid Chidi Gumbo (born 1988), Tanzanian football midfielder
 Rugare Gumbo, Zimbabwean politician
Sithembile Gumbo (1962/1963–2019), Zimbabwean politician

Surnames
Shona-language surnames